Rocky Point, Queensland may refer to:

 Rocky Point, Queensland (Douglas Shire)
 Rocky Point, Queensland (Weipa Town)